Carsten Thorvald Woll (1885-1962) was a leading Norwegian-American singer and recording artist of the 1910s and 1920s.

Biography
The singer and composer Carsten Woll was born in Oslo, Norway. He took his student exams in 1903 and subsequently studied music and voice in Denmark and Germany.

Woll immigrated to America in 1913 and was a professor first at Luther Seminary in St. Paul, Minnesota and then at St. Olaf College in Northfield, Minnesota. In 1926 he also became the director of the Woll Music Studio in Minot, North Dakota.  After retiring as a teacher of singing and music at St. Olaf College in 1951, he moved to Eugene, Oregon.

Music
Carsten Woll was one of the big names in Norwegian-American music with nearly two thousand live performances and frequent appearances at choral festivals. He wrote several songs and compiled a songbook that was published by the Sons of Norway in 1926. There were over one hundred Norwegian songs in the collection as well as Home, Sweet Home and the songs of Stephen Foster.

Woll's popularity as a singer made him one of the most sought-after Norwegian-American recording artists in the acoustic period.  From 1913 to 1925 he recorded almost 200 titles for a number of record companies. Most of his recordings were made for Victor and Columbia, but he also appeared on the Edison, Vocalion, Okeh and Brunswick labels.

Norwegian immigrants in America had a strong emotional attachment to the folk melodies of their homeland, and Carsten Woll probably made more recordings of traditional Norwegian folk songs than any other artist. His discography included Eg gjette Tulla, Eg veit ei lita jente, Kjerringa med staven and Og reven lå under birkerot. On the other hand,  his recording of Sommersol til siste stund was a Norwegian version of Silver threads among the gold.

See also
Carl G. O. Hansen

Gallery

References

External links

1926 Songbook
Preface
Index
Historic Newspapers
Carsten Woll
Discographies
Carsten Woll on Victor Records.
Carsten Woll in 1921 Victor Catalog.
Carsten Woll on Columbia Records.
Streaming audio at the Cylinder Preservation and Digitization Project
Carsten Woll
Norwegian songs
Streaming audio at the Library of Congress
Carsten Woll
Norwegian songs
Streaming audio at the Internet Archive
Carsten Woll
Olle i Gråthult: More songs recorded by Woll and others.  
Norwegian songs
Norwegian singers 
Gustavus Adolphus College
College and Lutheran Church Archives
Carsten Woll audio
Norwegian songs
Norwegian songs
Aa kjøre vatten aa kjøre ved
Deilig er jorden
Den store hvide flok vi se
Eg gjette Tulla
Eg veit ei lita jente
Kan du glemme gamle Norge
Kjerringa med staven
Og reven lå under birkerot
Syng mig hjæm
Sætergjentens Søndag
Songs from English
My heart and lute 
My heart and lute: Norwegian
Silver threads among the gold
Silver threads among the gold: Norwegian
Swedish song
Ingalill 
Ingalill: English

1885 births
1962 deaths
Brunswick Records artists
Columbia Records artists
Edison Records artists
Musicians from Eugene, Oregon
Norwegian emigrants to the United States
Okeh Records artists
American operatic tenors
Musicians from Oslo
St. Olaf College faculty
Victor Records artists
Vocalion Records artists
Singers from Oregon
20th-century American male singers
20th-century American singers
20th-century Norwegian male singers
20th-century Norwegian singers
Classical musicians from Oregon